Sanakeithel (English: Golden Market) is a 1983 Indian Meitei language film directed by Maibam Amuthoi Singh (M. A. Singh) and produced by Thoudam Doren, under the banner of ATB Films International. The movie stars A. Memi and Master Tony in the lead roles. The film won the National Film Award for Best Feature Film in Manipuri at the 31st National Film Awards.

The film was invited to the Singapore International Film Festival, 1984 and screened in Indian Panorama of International Film Festival of India (IFFI), 1984.

Synopsis
Nungshi, a righteous young widow rears up her only infant son Mobi. Although life is hard, she maintains her pride. On returning home long after a shopping trip, she is way laid and gang raped. The shock and trauma of bring criminally assaulted by men in succession have one immediate result. She becomes completely insane and her relation with her son becomes a memory thrown down a fathomless pit. Mobi is taken in by Nungshi's brother and is thoroughly exploited by his wife as a domestic servant. Mobi later became a scape goat for their martial discords and soon fled for the Sanakeithel with a flicker of hope for survival.

At Sanakeithel, he is picked up by Ebai, a psychopathic small time mafia don who introduces him to the rest of his gang of petty thieves. Two incidents in Mobi's foray the meeting with Babu, the tramp, from whom he realizes what a mother means: the meeting with a mad woman who often looks deep into his face trying to recollect something, arouses his yearning for his mother's love. He also starts discovering the various social and economic inequalities that typify contemporary Manipur. A chance encounter in which he hears his uncle trying to talk to the mad woman makes him realises that she is his mother. He starts doubling his efforts to make her happy and win her affection. He eventually saves her from Ebai. Knowing fully well that he will get no replay, he cries out, "Why were you made, mother?"

(MSFDS, 50 Years of Manipuri Cinema, Golden Jubilee Publication)

Cast
 A. Memi as Nungshi
 Master Tony as Mobi
 Somorendra
 Manaobi
 Upen
 Lalit
 Sahnawaz Khan
 Anwardi
 Holkhomang

Accolades
Sanakeithel won the National Film Award for Best Feature Film in Manipuri at the 31st National Film Awards. The citation for the National Award reads, "For the sympathetic portrayal of a human relationship in the context of a social tragedy".

References

External links
 

1983 films
Meitei-language films